The Lovers is an upcoming Sky Atlantic television series starring Johnny Flynn and Roisin Gallagher. It is written by David Ireland and directed by Justin Martin for Drama Republic and Sky Studios.

Synopsis
A foul mouthed supermarket worker (Gallagher) begins an unexpected relationship with a political television broadcaster (Flynn) who already has a seemingly perfect London life and celebrity girlfriend (Eve).

Cast
 Johnny Flynn as Seamus
 Roisin Gallagher as Janet
 Alice Eve
 Conleth Hill as Philip

Production
The project produced by Drama Republic, in association with Sky Studios for Sky Atlantic, was announced in June 2022. AMC Network joined the production through Sundance Now in August 2022 for North American rights with NBCUniversal Global Distribution selling the show internationally.

Casting
Johnny Flynn and Roisin Gallagher were announced to the cast in June 2022 In July 2022 Alice Eve was added to the cast.

Filming
Filming took place in Belfast in the summer of 2022. Flynn said his character was a "younger Andrew Marr or Robert Peston".

Broadcast
The series will be available in the United Kingdom on Sky Atlantic and streaming site Now TV with a first trailer for the six-part series released on February 9, 2023.

References

External links

Television shows filmed in Northern Ireland
Television shows set in Belfast